The 2014 North American Soccer League season was the 47th season of Division II soccer in the United States and the fourth season of the revived North American Soccer League. It was contested by ten teams including two from Canada. Joining the NASL in the Spring of 2014 were two new franchises, Indy Eleven and Ottawa Fury FC; originally Virginia Cavalry FC were to begin play this season but now plan to join in the 2016 season. The defending Soccer Bowl champions are the New York Cosmos, while the Carolina Railhawks are the defending North American Supporters' Trophy winners. A split season format was used again for the 2014 season.

Teams, stadiums, and personnel

Stadiums and locations

Personnel and sponsorship

Player transfers

Managerial changes

Spring season 
The Spring season lasted for 9 games beginning on April 12 and ending on June 8.  The schedule featured a single round robin format with each team playing every other team in the league a single time. Half the teams will host 5 home games and play 4 road games whereas the other half of the teams will play 4 home games and 5 road games.  The winner of the Spring season earns one of four berths in the playoffs, now known as The Championship.

Standings

Results

Fall season 

The Fall season will begin following a break for the 2014 FIFA World Cup on July 19 and ending on November 2, with each team playing the others twice, once home and once away. The winner of the Fall season will earn automatic berth in The Championship.

Standings

Results

Playoffs 
The playoffs were contested by the winners of the spring and fall seasons hosting the next best two teams in the full year regular season table. The half-season champions earned the top two seeds, with the higher seed going to the team with the better full-season record. The two next-best teams earned the third and fourth seeds. The semifinals took place on November 8 and 9, with the #1 seed hosting the #4 seed and #2 hosting #3. The winners met in Soccer Bowl 2014 on November 15, hosted by the team with the higher seed.

Combined standings

The Championship

Participants
Minnesota United (Spring season champion)
San Antonio Scorpions (Fall season champion)
New York Cosmos
Fort Lauderdale Strikers

Semifinals

Soccer Bowl 2014

Attendance

Statistical leaders

Top scorers

Source:

Top assists

Source:

Individual awards

Monthly awards

League awards

 Golden Ball (MVP):  Miguel Ibarra  (Minnesota United FC) 
 Golden Boot: Christian Ramirez (Minnesota United FC) 
 Golden Glove: John Smits (FC Edmonton) 
 Coach of the Year: Manny Lagos (Minnesota United FC) 
 Goal of the Year: Christian Ramirez (Minnesota United FC) 
 Young (U24) Player of the Year: Christian Ramirez (Minnesota United FC) 
 Humanitarian of the Year: Chris Nurse (Fort Lauderdale Strikers) 
 Fair Play Award: Tampa Bay Rowdies

References

External links
 

 
North American Soccer League seasons
North American Soccer League season